World Trade Center Trabzon (AWTCT) (AWTCT) is under development by Armada Holding Sti (part of Armada Group) by Build-Operate-Transfer (BOT) agreement with Trabzon Dünya Ticaret Merkezi A.Ş. The construction started in December 2016 and expected to be completed in 18 months  When completed it is expected to have 4 and 5 Star Hotels and to  organizes trade delegation programs, operates fair areas and offers Office, Convention and Meeting Halls.

The complex of World Trade Center Trabzon is situated close to Trabzon Airport.

Services and facilities
There are multiple exhibition halls, mixed-usage building with offices and residential units in addition to retail space.

WTC Trabzon Business Center
In addition,  It's parking lot is capable of 700 Cars.

Convention Center
The complex houses also the biggest convention center in Trabzon with a seating capacity for 2100 visitors.

Hotels
There are two Hotels, a Five Star Hotel and a Four Star Hotel.

Notable events hosted

See also
 Trabzon Province
 Trabzon Museum
 Trabzon
 Chepni
 Pontic Greeks
 Kadirga Festival
 Araklı
 Araklı Arena

References

External links
 Trabzon World Trade Center location

Buildings and structures in Trabzon
Convention centers in Turkey
Trade fairs in Turkey
Sports venues in Trabzon
Trabzon
Service companies of Turkey